Lahdenmäki is a Finnish surname that may refer to:

Jarkko Lahdenmäki (born 1991), Finnish football player 
Nathalie Lahdenmäki (born 1975), Finnish ceramic artist and designer

References

Finnish-language surnames